Carla Maria Zampatti ,  (19 May 1942 – 3 April 2021) was an Italian-born Australian fashion designer and businesswoman, and executive chair of the fashion label Carla Zampatti Limited.

Background 

Born in Lovero, Italy in 1942, Zampatti settled with her family in Fremantle, Western Australia in 1950. The family moved to Bullfinch WA and she attended school there for several years.

Career 

In 1965, Zampatti produced her first small collection for Zampatti Pty Limited, followed two years later by a national launch, and in 1970, by the establishment of Carla Zampatti Limited. Her clothes were appreciated and liked from the beginning. One of her early dresses, bought in 1967, was still in use for special occasions by its original purchaser in 2021 — a fact that contributed to ongoing debate about the quality and sustainability of fashion. It was worn again at the designer's funeral.

With the growth of the label, Zampatti moved into David Jones in 1990 and Myer stores in 1992, although she signed an exclusivity deal with David Jones in 2009. Australian singer of Italian descent, Tina Arena, is known to wear her pieces, as are other Australian icons Princess Mary of Denmark, Dannii Minogue, Delta Goodrem, and Ita Buttrose.

In 1973, Zampatti became one of the first Australian designers to introduce swimwear into her collection. Expanding into other areas of fashion, she was commissioned to create the first designer eyewear of Polaroid's range. In 1983, Zampatti launched her first perfume, 'Carla'. It was a success, and she released a second in 1987, 'Bellezza'. In partnership with Ford Australia, Zampatti redesigned a car especially for the women's market. Her first Laser, produced in 1985, was followed two years later with a collection of Lasers and Meteors.

Zampatti's daughter, Bianca Spender, spent her childhood in her mother's studio which lead to her interest in studying fashion in Paris. Bianca joined Carla Zampatti Limited with her own capsule collection from 2004. Bianca branched out and launched her own namesake brand in 2017.

Zampatti held a number of directorships, including chairman of the SBS Corporation, a director of the Westfield Group, and a trustee of the Art Gallery of New South Wales. She was a board member of the Australian Multicultural Foundation, the European Australian Business Council, Sydney Dance Company, MCA Foundation, and UTS V-C's Industry Advisory Board. From 1988 until her death in 2021, Zampatti served as a judge of the Ethnic Business Awards, a prestigious national award for migrant and Indigenous entrepreneurs which honours their contribution to the nation.

In 2015, HarperCollins published Zampatti's autobiography, My Life, My Look.

Honours 

Zampatti was appointed a Member of the Order of Australia (AM) in the 1987 Australia Day honours for service to the fashion industry as a designer and manufacturer. She was elevated as a Companion of the Order in the 2009 Queen's Birthday Honours List. In 2001 Zampatti was  awarded the Centenary Medal for service to Australian society in business leadership. Zampatti was a Bulletin/Qantas Businesswoman of the Year, and in 1994 the fashion industry of Australia named her Designer of the Year.

In January 2005, Zampatti was honoured by Australia Post and named on an commemorative Australian postage stamp, along with other Australian fashion designers, Prue Acton, Jenny Bannister, Collette Dinnigan, Akira Isogawa, and Joe Saba. The award is announced annually in the lead-up to Australia Day, and its recipients are individually featured on a postage stamp. Zampatti later designed the new Australia Post corporate wear, launched in October 2007.

In 2004, the Government of Italy appointed her a Commander of the Order of Merit of the Italian Republic.

The Australian Fashion Laureate Award was given to Zampatti in August 2008. The award is polled by members of the industry, an initiative of the New South Wales Government and IMG Fashion. It recognises outstanding achievement and is the highest honour in the Australian fashion industry.

In 1999, Zampatti was admitted as a Doctor of Letters honoris causa by the University of Western Sydney. In December 2018, the University of Wollongong also awarded her an honorary doctorate.

Personal life
Zampatti was married twice: she married Leo Schuman, her first husband, in 1964. They divorced in 1970. Her second husband was politician John Spender from 1975 until they separated in 2008, and divorced in 2010.

She had three children: Alex Schuman (CEO of Carla Zampatti Pty Ltd), Allegra Spender (Member of the Australian House of Representatives for Wentworth and CEO of Carla Zampatti Pty Ltd from 2008 to 2016), and Bianca Spender (designer).

Death
On 26 March 2021, Zampatti attended the opening night of La traviata at Mrs Macquarie's Point on Sydney Harbour, where she was knocked unconscious after falling on a staircase. She was taken to St Vincent's Hospital where she died from her injuries on 3 April, at the age of 78. Zampatti's family accepted the offer of a state funeral from the New South Wales government. The service was held at St Mary's Cathedral, Sydney on 15 April 2021, where many attendees wore her designs, and her daughter said “If she was alive, she’d say this is the best-dressed funeral she had ever attended.”

References

External links 

Carla Zampatti website

1942 births
2021 deaths
Accidental deaths from falls
Accidental deaths in New South Wales
Australian autobiographers
Australian fashion designers
Australian women company founders
Australian company founders
Companions of the Order of Australia
Commanders of the Order of Merit of the Italian Republic
Recipients of the Centenary Medal
Italian emigrants to Australia
People from the Province of Sondrio
Spouses of Australian politicians
Board members of the Special Broadcasting Service
Australian women fashion designers
Italian fashion designers
Italian women fashion designers